Adolescent Sex is the debut album by the English band Japan, released in April 1978 by record label Hansa. To avoid controversy over the title, the album was renamed simply as Japan in some countries.

Content 

According to AllMusic, Adolescent Sex "snarls with leftover punk intent, a few glam rock riffs, and a wealth of electronics that not only reach back to the band's youth, but also predate much of what would explode out of the next wave of British underground."

Release 

Though not a commercial success in their native UK, the album was better received abroad, particularly in Japan itself, where it peaked at No. 20, and in the Netherlands where the single "Adolescent Sex" reached number 27 in the Dutch Top 40 in 1979.

The Japanese release contained several mistranslations of song titles. "Transmission" became "Invitation to Fascination", "Suburban Love" became "Carousel of Love", and "Television" became "Temptation Screen".

The album was remastered and re-released as a digipak CD in April 2004, with four videos as bonus material.

Reception and aftermath 

Trouser Press wrote that the album "introduces Japan in all its guitar-rock misery, playing such Bowie-influenced tripe as 'Wish You Were Black' with less style than a sense of urgency". AllMusic retrospectively gave the album a 4.5 out of 5 grade, writing: "A more exciting album than just about anything else they'd ever record, Japan were young, hungry, and more than a little rough around the edges."

Within a couple of years of its release, the band publicly denounced the album.

David Sylvian also said in 1982:

Track listing

Personnel 

 Japan
 David Sylvian – lead vocals, rhythm guitar
 Rob Dean – lead guitar, backing vocals
 Richard Barbieri – keyboards, backing vocals
 Mick Karn – bass, backing vocals
 Steve Jansen – drums, backing vocals, percussion

 Additional personnel

 Ray Singer – production, additional backing vocals
 Pete Silver – engineering
 Dick Whitbread – cover design and artwork
 Graham Hughes – cover photo

Charts

Album

Singles

References

External links 

 

1978 debut albums
Japan (band) albums
Hansa Records albums